Forel may refer to:

 Auguste-Henri Forel (1848–1931), Swiss myrmecologist
 François-Alphonse Forel (1841–1912), Swiss hydrologist
 Several communes in Switzerland:
 Forel, Fribourg
 Forel, Vaud
 Forel-sur-Lucens, Vaud
The Forelle, a pear cultivar